(3 February 1903 – 8 September 1987) was a Japanese screenwriter, mostly famous for his adaptations of literary works for the director Tomu Uchida in the 1930s, such as Jinsei gekijō and Kagirinaki zenshin, and for his collaborations with leftist filmmakers such as Kaneto Shindo and Tadashi Imai in the postwar period. He served as president of the Japan Screenwriters Guild.

Filmography
  Screenplay: Makiba monogatari, “Tale of a Pasture”
Moyuru ōzora (1940)
Lucky Dragon No. 5 (1959)
The River with No Bridge (1969)

References

External links 

1903 births
1987 deaths
People from Gunma Prefecture
20th-century Japanese screenwriters